Municipal elections were held in Toronto, Ontario, Canada, on December 6, 1954. Incumbent mayor Leslie Saunders was defeated by Nathan Phillips in a close contest.

Toronto mayor
Controller Leslie Saunders had been appointed mayor after the resignation of Allan Lamport, who left to work with the Toronto Transit Commission. He was challenged by Nathan Phillips, a longtime city councilor who had made a previous attempt to win the mayoralty. Phillips was Jewish, a sharp departure from the standard for Toronto mayors, who for decades had been Protestant Orange Order members. 

Phillips' religion was an important issue in the election. Saunders publicly proclaimed he was running as "Leslie Saunders, Protestant". Saunders was a leader of the Orange Order and the publisher of the radical monthly newspaper Protestant Action. His anti-Catholicism and proclamations that Toronto was a "Protestant city" had caused controversy in the past. One of his first acts after ascending to the mayoralty was to issue an official proclamation commemorating The Twelfth, the anniversary of the victory of William of Orange over the Irish.

A second controversy arose during the election when Brown released accusation about room 1735 in the Royal York hotel. He argued that the room was a secret entertainment suite paid for by the city for the use of the mayor. Saunders claims that it was rented by Mayor Lamport and that he was totally unaware of the suite. Nonetheless the scandal hurt his reelection bid.

Also running was former school board head Arthur Brown, who had previously come close to defeating Lamport for the job, and who had the support of the Globe and Mail newspaper. The Toronto Star and the Telegram both supported Phillips. Saunders in his memoirs accuses Brown of splitting the "Christian and Gentile vote" and getting Phillips elected.

The fourth candidate was Communist A. A. MacLeod, former Labor-Progressive Party M.P.P in the Ontario legislature for Bellwoods. 

Results
Nathan Phillips - 40,683
Leslie Saunders - 36,756
Arthur Brown - 36,613
A. A. MacLeod - 4,932

Board of Control
Saunders' appointment to the mayoralty led to the appointment of Alderman Ross Lipsett to the Board of Control. This controversially passed over former Alderman Joseph Cornish, who had finished fifth in the 1953 election. In the 1954 election, Cornish displaced Lipsett to win the fourth and final seat on the Board. The most senior two Controllers in terms of votes also sat on Metro Toronto Council.

Results
Ford Brand (incumbent) - 69,540
Roy E. Belyea (incumbent) - 66,223
David Balfour (incumbent) - 62,871
Joseph Cornish  - 55,277
Ross Lipsett (incumbent) - 45,385
Harry Bradley - 20,488
Harry Hunter - 14,114
Ben Nobleman - 9,413
George Rolland - 5,280

City council

Two aldermen were elected per Ward. The alderman with the most votes was declared Senior Alderman and sat on both Toronto City Council and Metro Council. 

Ward 1 (Riverdale)
William Allen (incumbent)  - 8,855
Ken Waters (incumbent) - 8,042
George Phillips - 2,282
Stanley Hare - 1,381
Thornley - 932

Ward 2 (Regent Park and Rosedale)
William Dennison (incumbent) - 4,831
Edgar Roxborough (incumbent) - 4,479
Douglas Shaw - 2,268
C.M. Edwards - 1,551
Morrison - 669
Philip Rowley - 647

Ward 3 (West Downtown and Summerhill)
Howard Phillips (incumbent)  - acclaimed
John MacVicar (incumbent)  - acclaimed
Phillips was chosen to become Metro Councillor.

Ward 4 (The Annex, Kensington Market and Garment District)
Allan Grossman (incumbent) - 6,455
Herbert Orliffe (incumbent) - 5,345
Robert Laxer - 1,368
Bernard Levitt - 1,307
Blainey - 756

Ward 5 (Trinity-Bellwoods and Little Italy)
Philip Givens (incumbent) - 7,470
Joseph Gould (incumbent) - 6,770
Stewart Smith - 2,678
Teslia - 2,105

Ward 6 (Davenport and Parkdale)
May Robinson (incumbent) - 11,349
Frank Clifton (incumbent) - 10,470
Grittani - 2,763
Hector MacArthur - 2,067
Tennant - 1,684
Muir - 1,561
Patrick McKeown - 1,039

Ward 7 (Bloor West Village)
William Davidson (incumbent) - 6,228
John Kucherepa (incumbent) - 4,989
John Duncan - 3,951
John Weir - 1,915

Ward 8 (The Beaches)
Donald Summerville - 10,002
Alex Hodgins (incumbent) - 8,327
Albert G. Cranham - 6,485
William Probert (incumbent) - 3,169
McNulty - 2,553
James Davis - 1,210
John Square - 384

Ward 9 (North Toronto)
Jean Newman - 14,873
Leonard Reilly (incumbent)  - 11,261
David Burt (incumbent)  - 9,819
Frederick Vacher - 1,394

Results are taken from the December 7, 1954 Toronto Star and might not exactly match final tallies.

Suburbs

East York
Reeve
Harry G. Simpson - 3,723
Jack Allen - 2,613
John Warren - 2,211

Source: "East York Returns Reeve for 8th Term", The Globe and Mail (1936-2016); Toronto, Ont. [Toronto, Ont]06 Dec 1954: 1.

Etobicoke
Reeve
Beverley Lewis (acclaimed)

Deputy Reeve
Henry O. Waffle - 7,513
William R. Hodgson - 4,608

Source: Toronto Daily Star (1900-1971); Toronto, Ontario [Toronto, Ontario]07 Dec 1954: 7.

Forest Hill
Reeve
Charles O. Bick (acclaimed)

Source: Toronto Daily Star (1900-1971); Toronto, Ontario [Toronto, Ontario]07 Dec 1954: 7.

Leaside
Mayor
(incumbent)Howard T. Burrell (acclaimed)

Source: "Weston, Leaside Voters To Elect 10 Councillors", The Globe and Mail (1936-2016); Dec 3, 1954; ProQuest Historical Newspapers: pg. 8

Long Branch
Reeve
(incumbent)Marie Curtis 2,020
Sherman Anderson 248

Election occurred on December 11th.

Source: "Mrs. Marie Curtis Reeve Again By An Overwhelming Majority", Toronto Daily Star, December 13, 1954, pg 10

Mimico
Mayor
William Arthur (Gus) Edwards 1,669
(incumbent)Archibald Douglas Norris 1,256

Election occurred on December 11th.

Source: "Reeve W. Edwards Defeats Mayor Norris At Mimico", Toronto Daily Star, December 13, 1954, pg 10

New Toronto
Mayor
Donald Russell 1,811
(incumbent)John L. (Jack) Strath 841
Election occurred on December 11th.

Source: "Mayor Strath Defeated. D. Russell Easy Winner", Toronto Daily Star, December 13, 1954, pg 10

North York
Reeve
(incumbent)Fred J. McMahon - 18,224
Samuel Wagman - 3,837

Source: Toronto Daily Star (1900-1971); Toronto, Ontario [Toronto, Ontario]07 Dec 1954: 7.

Scarborough
Reeve
Oliver E. Crockford - 9,064
Richard Sutton - 8,036
Hilda Murray - 1,052

Deputy Reeve
Augustus Harris - 10,010
Fred Sloky - 7,889

Source: Toronto Daily Star (1900-1971); Toronto, Ontario [Toronto, Ontario]07 Dec 1954: 7.

Swansea
Reeve
(incumbent)Dorothy Hague (acclaimed)

Weston
Harry Clark (acclaimed)

Source: "Election Returns", The Globe and Mail (1936-2016); Toronto, Ont. [Toronto, Ont]06 Dec 1954: 32

York
Reeve
(incumbent)Frederick W. Hall - 10,724
Charles McMaster - 3,178
Norman Penner - 1,723

Source: "Election Results", The Globe and Mail (1936-2016); Toronto, Ont. [Toronto, Ont]06 Dec 1954: 32.

References

Election Coverage. Toronto Star. December 7, 1955
Nathan Phillips. Mayor of All the People McClelland and Stewart, 1967
Leslie Howard Saunders. An Orangeman in public life: the memoirs of Leslie Howard Saunders. Britannia Printers, 1980

Toronto
1954
1954 in Ontario
December 1954 events in Canada